The 1993 Liberty Bowl was a college football bowl game played at Liberty Bowl Memorial Stadium in Memphis, Tennessee, on December 28, 1993, as part of the 1993–94 bowl season. The 35th edition of the Liberty Bowl, the game matched the Michigan State Spartans of the Big Ten Conference, and the Louisville Cardinals, a football independent. Louisville defeated Michigan State, 18–7.

Scoring summary

First quarter
Michigan State – Duane Goulbourne 1 yard touchdown run (Bill Stoyanovich kick), 10:10 left. 
Louisville – David Akers 31 yard field goal, 7:07 left.

Fourth quarter
Louisville – Reggie Ferguson 25 yard touchdown pass from Jeff Brohm (David Akers kick), 12:05 left.
Louisville – Safety, Craig Thomas tackled in end zone by Joe Johnson and Tyrus McCloud, 8:53 left. 
Louisville – Ralph Dawkins 11 yard touchdown run (kick failed), 4:57 left.

Statistics

References

Liberty Bowl
Liberty Bowl
Michigan State Spartans football bowl games
Louisville Cardinals football bowl games
Liberty Bowl
December 1993 sports events in the United States